The 1828 United States presidential election in Delaware took place between October 31 and December 2, 1828, as part of the 1828 United States presidential election. Voters chose three representatives, or electors to the Electoral College, who voted for President and Vice President.

Delaware cast three electoral votes for the National Republican candidate, John Quincy Adams, over the Democratic candidate, Andrew Jackson. These electors were elected by the Delaware General Assembly, the state legislature, rather than by popular vote.

Results

See also
 United States presidential elections in Delaware

References

Delaware
1828
1828 Delaware elections